Gagangad is a fort situated in Gaganbawada tehsil of Kolhapur district in Maharashtra, India. It was built in 1190.
This fort is situated 55 km west of Kolhapur city. There's at below fort mahadev temple and gagangiri Maharaj math. This fort situated at very thick rain Forrest of Maharashtra's Western Ghats you can reach Fort by your vehicle and then you can walk for about 1 hour for reach the top of the fort.

Forts in Kolhapur district
Buildings and structures of the Maratha Empire